The Glen Ridge Public Schools is a comprehensive public school district serving students in kindergarten through twelfth grade in Glen Ridge, in Essex County, New Jersey, United States.

As of the 2020–21 school year, the district, comprised of five schools, had an enrollment of 1,842 students and 157.1 classroom teachers (on an FTE basis), for a student–teacher ratio of 11.7:1.

The district is classified by the New Jersey Department of Education as being in District Factor Group "I", the second-highest of eight groupings. District Factor Groups organize districts statewide to allow comparison by common socioeconomic characteristics of the local districts. From lowest socioeconomic status to highest, the categories are A, B, CD, DE, FG, GH, I and J.

Schools 
Schools in the district (with 2018–19 enrollment data from the National Center for Education Statistics) are:
Central School with 93 students in grades PreK-2
Keisha Harris, Principal
Forest Avenue School with 176 students in grades PreK-2
Matthew J. Murphy, Principal
Linden Avenue School with 166 students in grades PreK-2
Dr. Joseph A. Caravela, Principal
Ridgewood Avenue School with 536 students in grades 3-6
Dr. Michael Donovan, Principal
Glen Ridge High School with 852 students in grades 7-12. The high school gained national attention as the school of the athletes involved in the Glen Ridge Rape.
John Lawlor, Principal

Administration
Core members of the district's administration are:
Dirk Phillips, Superintendent
Barbara Murphy, Business Administrator / Board Secretary

Board of education
The district's board of education, comprised of nine members, sets policy and oversees the fiscal and educational operation of the district through its administration. As a Type II school district, the board's trustees are elected directly by voters to serve three-year terms of office on a staggered basis, with three seats up for election each year held (since 2013) as part of the November general election. The board appoints a superintendent to oversee the day-to-day operation of the district.

References

External links 
Glen Ridge Schools Website

School Data for the Glen Ridge Public Schools, National Center for Education Statistics

Public Schools
New Jersey District Factor Group I
School districts in Essex County, New Jersey